The 1921 NC State Aggies football team was an American football team that represented North Carolina State University during the 1921 college football season. In its second season under head coach Harry Hartsell, the team compiled a 3–3–3 record.

Schedule

References

NC State
NC State Wolfpack football seasons
NC State Aggies football